The British Swimming Championships - 400 metres individual medley winners formerly the (Amateur Swimming Association (ASA) National Championships) are listed below.

The event was originally contested over 440 yards and then switched to the metric conversion of 400 metres in 1971. In 1968 there was a dead-heat in the men's final.

400 metres individual medley champions

See also
British Swimming
List of British Swimming Championships champions

References

Swimming in the United Kingdom